The following are major and notable roads in Baltimore County, Maryland.

A

B

C

D

E

F

G

H

I

J

K

L

M

N

O

P

R

S

T

W

Y

See also

 List of streets in Baltimore, Maryland

References

Roads in Baltimore County, Maryland
Baltimore County
Baltimore-related lists